Hrastovec is a settlement in the Municipality of Velenje in northern Slovenia. The area is part of the traditional region of Styria. The municipality is now included in the Savinja Statistical Region.

Name
The name of the settlement was changed from Sveti Bric (literally, 'Saint Brice') to Hrastovec in 1955. The name was changed on the basis of the 1948 Law on Names of Settlements and Designations of Squares, Streets, and Buildings as part of efforts by Slovenia's postwar communist government to remove religious elements from toponyms.

Turn Castle
It was greatly rebuilt and remodelled over the centuries, with the last major building phase dating to the 18th century.

References

External links
Hrastovec at Geopedia

Populated places in the City Municipality of Velenje